Örebro Municipality is a municipality in Örebro County in central Sweden. Its seat is located in the city of Örebro.

The municipality was created from the City of Örebro and surrounding rural municipalities in 1971 and with some areas added in 1974 it had an area of 1,840 km2. In 1995 the municipality was split in two when Lekeberg Municipality was recreated in its boundaries from 1967.

Localities
Towns and localities with more than 800 inhabitants:
 Örebro 107,038 (seat)
 Hovsta 2,700
 Odensbacken 1,400
 Vintrosa 1,300
 Mosås 900
 Stora Mellösa 800

Others:
 Latorp 500

Demographics

Population development

2022 by district
This is a demographic table based on Örebro Municipality's electoral districts in the 2022 Swedish general election sourced from SVT's election platform, in turn taken from SCB official statistics.

Residents include everyone registered as living in the district, regardless of age or citizenship status. Valid voters indicate Swedish citizens above the age of 18 who therefore can vote in general elections. Left vote and right vote indicate the result between the two major blocs in said district in the 2022 general election. Employment indicates the share of people between the ages of 20 and 64 who are working taxpayers. Foreign background denotes residents either born abroad or with two parents born outside of Sweden. Median income is the received monthly income through either employment, capital gains or social grants for the median adult above 20, also including pensioners in Swedish kronor. College graduates indicates any degree accumulated after high school.

In total there were 117,940 Swedish citizen adults eligible to vote. The political demographics were 52.1 % for the left bloc and 46.1 % for the right bloc.

Elections
From the 1994 election onwards there was a boundary change due to the split with Lekeberg Municipality. The exact results of Sweden Democrats were not listed at a municipal level by SCB from 1988 to 1998 due to the party's small size at the time. "Turnout" denotes the percentage of eligible people casting any ballots, whereas "Votes" denotes the number of valid votes only.

Riksdag

Twin towns

Örebro's seven twin towns with the year of its establishing:

(1946) Kolding Municipality, Denmark 
(1946) Drammen, Norway 
(1947) Lappeenranta (Villmanstrand), Finland 
(1979) Stykkishólmur, Iceland 
(2001) Łódź, Poland 
(2002) Yantai, China 
(2003) Terrassa, Spain

See also
Statistics Sweden
Nerikes Allehanda (newspaper)
Julmust (Christmas beverage)
List of hundreds of Sweden

References

External links

Örebro Municipality - Official site

 
Örebro
Municipalities of Örebro County